The Portuguese National Badminton Championships is a tournament organized to crown the best badminton players in Portugal. The tournament started in 1956.

Past winners

References
Badminton Europe - Details of affiliated national organisations
Federação Portuguesa de Badminton Yearbook

Badminton tournaments in Portugal
National badminton championships
Sports competitions in Portugal
Recurring sporting events established in 1956